Beginning in 2015, Saudi Arabia led a coalition of forces to intervene in the civil war in Yemen. Different types of airframes like fixed-wing aircraft, helicopters and drones have been lost due to accident or enemy action in the course of the war.

2015 
  25 March 2015 - A Yemeni Airforce CASA CN-235M-300 cargo plane is destroyed in the ground on Al-Dulaimi Air Base, Sanaa International Airport by the Saudi led Coalition, during the opening day of Operation Decisive Storm.
  25 March 2015 - A Yemeni Airforce Beechcraft Super King Air utility aircraft is destroyed in the ground on Al-Dulaimi Air Base by the Saudi led Coalition in the same incident.
  (2) 25 March 2015 - Two Yemeni Airforce Huey Bell 214 helicopters parked on the Al-Dulaimi Air Base, were destroyed in the ground by the Saudi led Coalition, during the opening day of Operation Decisive Storm.
  (4) 25 March 2015 – Saudi Coalition strikes destroyed Yemeni Airforce aircraft in their hangars at Sanaa International Airport and Al Anad Air Base, including four Su-22s ground attack fighters and one Mi-8 helicopter, during the opening hours of Operation Decisive Storm.
 26 March 2015 – During the opening strikes, a Royal Saudi Air Force F-15S crashed into the Gulf of Aden after circling around over the sea; its two pilots ejected safely and were recovered from the sea by a U.S. Air Force HH-60G rescue helicopter. Arab coalition reports stated enemy fire did not cause the crash, while Houthi and Iranian sources stated they shot it down.
 27 March 2015 – During opening days of Operation Decisive Storm, Houthi forces said they shot down a Sudanese Air Force Su-24 in Yemen using a SA-2 missile. Houthis published photos of a captured Sudanese pilot and the aircraft wreckage.
  4 May 2015 - A Houthi - Saleh-led Government Ilyushin Il-76TD cargo plane was destroyed by Saudi Coalition strikes in Sanaa International Airport.
 7 May 2015 – Damaged or Destroyed– A Saudi Arabian Army Aviation Boeing AH-64 Apache helicopter made an emergency landing just inside the Yemeni territory in Najran, because of a technical failure. The Houthis claimed they forced the helicopter down. The helicopter suffered minor damage according to Saudi officials.
 9 May 2015 – Claim – The Houthis claimed they shot down a Saudi Arabian Army Aviation Boeing AH-64 Apache helicopter in Baqem district in Sa'ada, capturing both pilots. No other sources confirmed or denied the claim.
 10 May 2015 – At 18:00 local time, one Royal Moroccan Air Force F-16C Block 52, serial number 08-8008, crashed in Saadah, while performing a mission as part of the Saudi-led intervention in Yemen. The pilot of a second F-16 said that he did not see any ejection. Originally missing for several hours, on 11 May, Houthi rebels showed the crash site, located near Nushoor, Sa'ada. They claimed they shot the jet down with anti-aircraft artillery fire while the pilot was killed in the crash. Other sources claim the F-16 was shot down by anti-aircraft guns or MANPADS.
 3 August 2015 - A Saudi Arabian Seeker 400 is shot down in Al-Buqa, Saada.
 5 August 2015 – The Houthis claimed they shot down a Saudi Arabian Army Aviation Boeing AH-64 Apache helicopter in western province of Hajjah. Saudi Arabian press denied the claim adding that the airframe made an emergency landing by a technical issue.
 21 August 2015 – A Saudi Arabian Army Aviation Boeing AH-64 Apache helicopter was lost near the Tawal border crossing in Jizan, both pilots were killed. According to Saudi forces the chopper crashed, but according to Yemeni reports it was shot down.
 21 August 2015 – Houthi forces shot down a Schiebel Camcopter S-100 operated by the United Arab Emirates Army in Dhubab.
 20 September 2015 – One Saudi Arabian Army Aviation Boeing AH-64 Apache helicopter was shot down.
 26 September 2015 – Claim – The Houthis claimed they shot down a Saudi Arabian Army Aviation Boeing AH-64 Apache helicopter in jizan Province. No other sources confirmed or denied the claim.
 25 October 2015 – Houthi forces shot down another Schiebel Camcopter S-100 operated by the United Arab Emirates Army in Al-Abdiyah.
 30 December 2015 – A RBAF F-16C was lost in Jizan Region, Saudi Arabia. A military source reported that the pilot ejected and survived the crash. The F-16 was already in flames before hitting the ground as recorded on video. The loss was initially attributed to a technical malfunction, but other sources claim the F-16 was instead shot down by anti-aircraft guns or MANPADS.

2016 
 27 February 2016 – Houthi forces announce the destruction of a Schiebel Camcopter S-100 operated by the United Arab Emirates Army in Dhubab.
 14 March 2016 – A UAEAF Dassault Mirage 2000-9D crashed in the southern Yemeni city of Aden during a combat operation in the early morning hours, killing its two pilots. The coalition claimed the Mirage crashed due to a technical fault. Other sources reported that the Mirage 2000-9D was shot down while flying low by Yemeni Al-Qaeda militants using a Strela-2 MANPADS.
 13 June 2016 – A UAEAF NSA 407MRH helicopter crashed with both pilots reported killed in the crash.
 25 July 2016 – One Saudi Arabian Army Aviation Boeing AH-64 Apache crashed in Marib, killing both pilots.
 16 August 2016 - A Saudi Arabian Seeker 400 is shot down in Kitaf, Saada.
 26 September 2016 - A UAEAF CAIG Wing Loong I is shotdown by Houthi fighters, photos are displayed of the drone wreckage.

2017 
 29 January 2017 – During US Raid on Yakla on al-Qaeda in the Arabian Peninsula militants a Bell Boeing V-22 Osprey crash landed and was subsequently destroyed by US fire to avoid falling in enemy hands.
 30 January 2017 – Damaged - Houthi rebels attacked Al-Madinah frigate in Al-Hudaydah coast. A Saudi Arabian Army Aviation SA-365 helicopter was targeted and damaged by the Houthis.
 14 February 2017 – A United Arab Emiates UAV MQ-1B shot down by Houthi anti aircraft missile over Marib province.
 24 February 2017 – A Royal Jordanian Air Force F-16 crashed in Najran, Saudi Arabia, a military source reported that the pilot survived the crash. Houthis claimed to have shot down the aircraft.
 16 March 2017 – A Saudi Arabian Army Aviation Boeing AH-64 Apache was shot down by Houthi rebels.
 18 April 2017 – Saudi Arabian Army Aviation Sikorsky UH-60L Black Hawk crashed in Marib killing 12 soldiers on board. According to the Yemeni Ministry of Defense of the Hadi led Government, the helicopter was shot down by mistake after it was "misread" by the coalition air defenses.
 21 June 2017 – Houthi forces shot down a Schiebel Camcopter S-100 operated by the United Arab Emirates Army in Dhubab, Taiz.
 11 August 2017 – A UAEAF Sikorsky UH-60M Black Hawk helicopter crashed due to a technical problem in Shabwa, with 4 soldiers killed and 3 injured.
 15 August 2017 - A Saudi Arabian Seeker 400 drone is shot down in Al-Buqa, Najran.
 25 August 2017 – A United States Army Aviation Branch Sikorsky MH-60M Black Hawk, belonging to the 160th SOAR (A) was conducting hoist training a few feet above the water when it crashed 20 miles off southern coast of Yemen at approx 7:00 p.m. local time. One crew member died while other five were recovered.
 11 September 2017 – A UAEAF IOMAX AT-802U crashed in Yemen, killing the pilot.
 13 September 2017 – A RSAF Eurofighter Typhoon involved in close air support mission against Houthi fighters over Yemen crashed into a mountain in Al Wade’a district, reportedly due to a technical malfunction. The pilot died in the crash.
 1 October 2017 – U.S. Central Command stated that a MQ-9 Reaper had been shot down by Houthi air defense systems over Sanaa in western Yemen the previous day.  The aircraft took off from Chabelley Airport in Djibouti and was armed.
 17 October 2017 – A UAEAF Boeing AH-64 Apache crashed due to technical failure in Yemen resulting in the death of 2 Emirati pilots.

2018 
 7 January 2018 – Houthi rebels claimed to have shot down a Saudi fighter which was conducting air raids over northern Yemen, releasing Optical Infrared camera footage of a fighter being targeted by a missile. Later Houthis published footage of the remains of a Panavia Tornado crashed in Saada. Saudi media reported, that the downed aircraft was a Panavia Tornado of the Saudi Royal Air Force which was on a combat mission in the skies over Saada province in northern Yemen, but that it was lost for 'technical reasons' and that both crew members were rescued.
 8 January 2018 – Damaged – A RSAF aircraft was hit by a Houthi surface-to-air missile. A Houthi released another video in a separate claim a day before showing what appears to be F-15 increasing speed and releasing decoy flares before being struck by a projectile and apparently suffering major damage. On 9 January 2018 the Houthi media, Al-Masirah, announced that the F-15 had been damaged.
 21 March 2018 – Damaged or Destroyed– Houthi rebels claimed to hit and shot down a RSAF F-15 in Saada province. Saudi official sources confirmed the incident reporting that it happened at 3:48 pm local time after a surface-to-air defense missile was launched at the fighter, also indicating that the fighter returned to its air base and landed safely.
 31 May 2018 – A Saudi Arabian Army Aviation Boeing AH-64 Apache helicopter was reportedly shot down by Houthi fighters according to the Yemeni Defense Ministry, both crewmen died in the crash.
 12 July 2018 – A Saudi Arabian Royal Air Force Panavia Tornado crashes in Asir region after returning from Saada, Yemen a technical malfunction was the reason of the crash.
 12 July 2018 – Houthi rebels shot down an armed Saudi Arabian CH-4B drone near Asir border.
 24 July 2018 – (2) Houthi Qasef-1 drones carrying explosives are shot down by UAE armed forces. One was headed to  Al Mokha and the other to Al Khokha in the Hodeidah province.
 8 August 2018 – Houthi rebels shot down an armed Saudi Arabian CH-4B drone near Tuwal border crossing.
 2 September 2018 – Houthi forces shot down a Schiebel Camcopter S-100 operated by the United Arab Emirates Army in Al-Jah.
 14 September 2018 – A Saudi Arabian Army Aviation Boeing AH-64 Apache helicopter crashed following technical issues while it was on a reconnaissance mission in Yemeni eastern province of al-Mahrah. Both pilots died.
 26 November 2018 – Houthi forces shot down a UAE Denel Dynamics Seeker 400 drone in Hudaydah.
 23 December 2018 – Houthi rebels shot down a Saudi Arabian CH-4 drone in Saada province, northern Yemen and displayed the wreckage of the drone.

2019 
 12 February 2019 – Houthi forces shot down a Saudi Arabian EMT Luna X-2000 drone near the Saudi Border.
 23 March 2019 – Houthis announced the shot down a US MQ-1 drone over Saana, Yemen. Later displaying images of the wreckage.
 11 April 2019 – A Saudi Arabian CH-4 drone is lost over Yemen, according to Houthi media the Saudi drone was shot down by friendly fire
 19 April 2019 – The Houthis published a video of the downing and the crash site of a UAEAF CAIG Wing Loong I acting for Saudi-led intervention over Saada district. It was probably shot down with a R-73 or R-27T missile.
 14 May 2019 – A United Arab Emirates MQ-1 Predator was shot down by Houthi fire during a night flight in Saana, Houthi fighters used an air-to-air missile (R-27T or R-73) with a modified land operator device.
 26 May 2019 – Saudi air defense intercepted a Houthi drone targeting King Abdullah bin Abdulaziz Airport in Jizan.
 2 June 2019 – Houthi forces shot down a Schiebel Camcopter S-100 operated by the United Arab Emirates Army in Hays, Hudaydah.
 6 June 2019 – Houthis shot down a US MQ-9 Reaper drone over Yemen, using a SA-6 missile, the CENTCOM asserted that the event “indicated an improvement over previous Houthi capability,” and that it was enabled with Iranian assistance.
 15 July 2019 – (2) Houthi drones targeting Jizan and Abha airport in Saudi Arabia are intercepted by the coalition.
 21 August 2019 – Houthis shot down another US MQ-9 Reaper unarmed drone over Dhamar, Yemen. The claim was corroborated by two US officials.
 1 November 2019 – Houthi rebels shot down a Schiebel Camcopter S-100 drone over al-Hudaydah.
/  1 November 2019 - Claim - A US-made ScanEagle drone is reported shot down by Houthi rebels in Asir province, Yemen.
  29 November 2019 – A Saudi Arabian Army Aviation AH-64 Apache was shot down by Houthi rebels using a surface to air missile. A video released by the Houthis clearly shows a surface to air missile fired at a patrolling Apache until the helicopter is hit and crashes in flames. Both pilots died. However, nor Yemen nor Iran had any 9K33 Osa in their armed forces, while known Houthis' operated systems are based on the Soviet made surface-to-air 2K12 Kub which employs a two stage rocket engine and the air-to-air missiles R-73 and R-27T which both have a single stage rocket engine.
 30 November 2019 – The Houthis published photos of the remains of a CAIG Wing Loong I, serial number 20207, indicating it was shot down. Houthi media published pictures of the drone wreckage.
 31 December 2019 – Houthis announced their forces shot down two Saudi-led Coalition drones, one in Razih district in Saada and another in the Red Sea port city of Hodeidah. Later the Houthis published footage of the downing and later recovery of the remains of a Turkish-made Vestel Karayel drone.

2020 
 7 January 2020 – Houthi rebels shot down an armed Saudi Arabian CH-4B drone over Jawf province.
 5 February 2020 – Houthi rebels with the help of their Popular Committees shot down a Saudi Arabian "spy drone" in Al Hudaydah. Later a photo of the drone wreck is shown by Houthis
 14 February 2020 – In the night of 14 February 2020, a Saudi Panavia Tornado was shot down during close air support mission in support of Saudi allied Yemeni forces in the Yemeni Al Jawf governorate by Houthis. On the day after, the Saudi command confirmed the loss of a Tornado, while video evidence was released showing the downing using a two stage surface to air missile. Both pilots ejected and were captured by Houthis according to the Saudi Coalition.
 20 February 2020 – Unknown militants shot down a helicopter operated by militia units loyal to the Islah party near the town of Shibam, Hadhramaut governorate.
Sources mistakenly identify as the Shahed 129. 
 2 August 2020 – Houthi rebels said they shot down a US-made drone in Harad province. A video posted by the Houthis showed the remains of a bullet riddled RQ-20 Puma drone with Saudi Arabian Army markings.
 22 December 2020 – Houthi rebels shot down a Saudi Arabian CH-4B drone, serial number 20311 on the district of Madghal in Marib province.

2021
 6 January 2021 – Houthis shoot down a Vestel Karayel drone operated by the Saudi-led Coalition in Al-Jawl province. Houthis published footage of the drone being targeted by a missile and its remains.
 12 February 2021 – Houthis intercepted a Saudi Arabian CASC Rainbow CH-4 drone in Meghdal, Marib Governorate, displaying footage of the shot down.
 28 February 2021 – Houthis shot down and published video footage of the wreck of a Saudi drone lost over Hays district on Hodeidah province.
 7 March – Houthi forces shot down a Saudi Coalition Vestel Karayel drone in Yemen. Later publishing footage of the wreckage of the drone.
 (3) 7 March 2021 – During a Houthi attack at several Saudi oil installations, Saudi F-15s claimed several attacking drones shot down using heatseeking AIM-9 Sidewinder missiles, with video evidence showing  at least two Samad-3 UAVs and one Qasef-2K downed,  with other possibly hit by ground based Hawk and Patriot systems.
 23 March 2021 - A Houthi spokesman said that Houthi forces shot down a US MQ-9 Reaper drone operating in Marib, however a day later the Houthis published footage of the shootdown depicting a drone resembling  a Chinese CH-4 drone currently operated by Saudi Arabia.
 20 May 2021 - Houthi media announced the downing of a Saudi Coalition Wing Loong II drone in Najran region. Later displaying photos of the wreckage of the downed drone.
 23 May 2021 - A Saudi Coalition CH-4 drone is shot down by Houthi fighters in Al-Maraziq, Al-Jawf governarate. Later Houthi media wing released a video of the shotdown of the drone.
/ (2) 19-21 June 2021 - Houthi media reported two Saudi led Coalition drones shot down in Marib governorate. Later publishing video footage of the interception of one ScanEagle drone and the debris of both drones. US officials denied that the downed drones were military assets operated by CENTCOM.
/  14 August 2021 - A US-made ScanEagle drone is reported shot down by Houthi rebels in Marib, Yemen. Houthis later published photos of the downed drone.
 13 September 2021 - Houthi media announced the downing of a Saudi Coalition Wing Loong II drone in Kataf area, Saada region, displaying footage of the shotdown.
/  27 September 2021 - Houthi fighters shot down a US-made Eagle Scan drone in Meghdal region, Marib. Displaying images of the wreck surrounded by its fighters.
 6 October 2021 – Houthis media reported the shot down of a Saudi Arabian CASC Rainbow CH-4 drone in Juba district, southern Marib province by Houthi Air Defenses, later displaying footage of the drone wreck.
 7 October 2021 - Houthis shot down a US-made RQ-20 Puma drone operated by Saudi Arabian forces in Jizan region. Media close to Houthis published footage of the drone wreck.
 9 October  2021 – During a Houthi drone and ballistic attack on Jizan international airport, Saudi Air defenses shot down a Houthi Samad-2 suicide drone, displaying photos of the wreckage.
/  9 November 2021 - Houthi forces reported the interception and shot down of a US-made ScanEagle drone in al-Jubah district, Marib. Later displaying footage of the drone wreckage a day after.
/  13 November 2021 - Another US-made ScanEagle drone in reported shot down in Marib. The footage of the drone was announced to be displayed later by Houthi officials.
 1 December 2021 – Houthi forces shoot down a CASC Rainbow CH-4 combat drone near al-Amshiyah on Harf Sufyan district, Amran Governorate. Displaying footage of the drone wreck.
/ 4 December 2021 - Houthi forces shot down a US-built ScanEagle in Marib. Later publishing a video of the wreckage of the drone.

2022
 11 January 2022 – Houthi forces shot down another UAEAF Wing Loong UCAV in Ain district in Shabwa province. Displaying footage of the interception and the wreckage of the airframe two days after.
 13 January 2022 – A Houthi Mil Mi-24 attack helicopter was destroyed on the ground by the Saudi led Coalition in Marib. Footage of the attack is displayed by the Saudi Coalition.
/ 29 January 2022 - Houthi forces said they shot down a US-made ScanEagle from the Saudi led Coalition in Marib. Later media close to the Houthis displayed footage of the wreck.
 10 February 2022 - Houthi forces shot down and published the wreckage of a CASC Rainbow CH-4 combat drone operated by the Saudi led coalition in Haradh district in Hajjah province, western Yemen.
 25 February 2022 – Houthi forces shot down a UAEAF MQ-1 drone of the Saudi led Coalition in Al-Jawf province.
/ 26 February 2022 - Houthi forces shot down a US-made ScanEagle from the Saudi led Coalition in al-Jubah district, Marib. Later publishing footage of the drone wreckage.
/ 28 February 2022 - Houthi air defences shot down a US-made ScanEagle from the Saudi led Coalition in Hajjah governorate. Later publishing footage of the drone wreckage.
/ 8 March 2022 - Houthi air defences shot down a US-made ScanEagle from the Saudi led Coalition in Hajjah.
 5 May 2022 - Houthi forces shot down and published the wreckage of a CASC Rainbow CH-4 combat drone operated by the Saudi led coalition in Haradh district in Hajjah province, western Yemen.
 21 May 2022 -One Turkish made Vestel Karayel drone operated by the Saudi Coalition was shot down by Houthi fighters in Hajjah governorate. Later Houthis released footage of the drone wreck.
 23 May 2022 - Houthi forces shot down and published the wreckage of a CASC Rainbow CH-4 combat drone operated by the Saudi led coalition in Sanaa.
 6 August 2022: A US RQ-21 drone was shot down by Houthi rebels in Mahesh, eastern Yemen. Media close to Houthis displayed wreckage of the drone.

By type

See also 

List of aircraft shootdowns

Notes

References 

 

Yemen
Yemen
Aviation shootdowns
Civil War, aircraft lost
Aircraft lost